Si Pho Ngoen is a tambon (subdistrict) of Pa Daet District, in Chiang Rai Province, Thailand. In 2018 it had a total population of 1,997 people.

History
The subdistrict was created effective June 19, 1990 by splitting off 8 administrative villages from San Makha.

Administration

Central administration
The tambon is subdivided into 8 administrative villages (muban).

Local administration
The whole area of the subdistrict is covered by the subdistrict municipality (Thesaban Tambon) Si Pho Ngoen (เทศบาลตำบลศรีโพธิ์เงิน).

References

External links
Thaitambon.com on Si Pho Ngoen

Tambon of Chiang Rai province
Populated places in Chiang Rai province